Natalia Vladimirovna Guseva née Sorokina (born 12 September 1982 in Tikhvin, Russian SFSR) is a Russian female biathlete who lives in Saint Petersburg. Besides her biathlon career, she is a professional soldier, and as such represents the Russian Army sports club.

Career highlights 
Major championships:
 Guseva has one World Championship medal: the bronze in the Sprint event of the 2007 World Championships in Antholz, Italy. In the same Championships, she got three other top-10 placements: 4th place in the Pursuit, 4th in the Mass start, and 7th in the Relay.
 In the 2004 World Championships in Oberhof, Germany, Guseva finished 10th in the Pursuit, and 7th in the Mass start.
 In her first Winter Olympics, the 2006 OWG in Torino, she took part in the Mass start event, where she finished 24th.

Biathlon World Cup:
 Guseva has one BWC race victory, the Sprint in Antholz in the 2003-04 season.
 She has one second place, in the Mass start at the same BWC meet.
 She has two third places: the Individual competition in Hochfilzen in the 2005-06 season, and the Sprint in Antholz in the 2006-07 season, the same Sprint as the World Championship one where she got her bronze medal.

External links 
 
 

1982 births
Living people
People from Tikhvin
Russian female biathletes
Biathletes at the 2006 Winter Olympics
Olympic biathletes of Russia
Biathlon World Championships medalists
Sportspeople from Leningrad Oblast